Richard C. Ogden is an Oklahoma attorney currently serving as a district judge in Oklahoma County.

Ogden was born and raised in Guymon, Oklahoma, where he completed high school. Richard Ogden's father and uncle had both chosen the law as a career path and had prospered in the Oklahoma Panhandle. The father ran for political office and eventually became Majority Floor Leader in the Oklahoma House of Representatives. After retiring from that position in the late 1960s, Richard's father opened a private law practice in Guymon. Then he ran for and won the office of District Judge. One biography said that,"... he was so popular that he was reelected to his position as District Judge, in a contested election, by a 91% margin, even after his death in 1990.

Education in law and early practice 
He earned a B.A. degree in political science from Oklahoma State University in 1986, and the juris doctor degree from Oklahoma University in 1989. While still working toward his degrees, Ogden became active in politics, served as an intern and campaigned for political candidates (including David Boren, who was then a senator). After graduating, he worked for a few years in the law firm of Joel Carson, before opening his own office in Guymon. Soon, he recruited friends and colleagues to join him. In 1996, he was elected as chairman of the Oklahoma Bar Association (OBA) Young Lawyers Division.

In 2010, Oklahoma Governor Brad Henry appointed Ogden to a nine-year term on the Regional University System of Oklahoma, which is responsible for overseeing the functions of all six state University systems. According to McKenney, Ogden has said that he found the experience enjoyable and fulling. However, he was required to leave the position before accepting another state position.
 
Governor Mary Fallin appointed him on May 17, 2017, to Office 11 of the Oklahoma County District Judge to replace Judge Barbara Swinton, who had resigned to accept an appointment to the Oklahoma Court of Civil Appeals.  Prior to his appointment as district judge, he had served for two years as a special judge in Oklahoma County, and before that he was in private legal practice for twenty-five years.

According to Ballotpedia, Ogden won retention in 2018 as a nonpartisan candidate, when he was unopposed. He did not appear on the ballot.

Since January 1995, Ogden has been a partner in the Oklahoma City law firm, where he serves as vice president and manager.

Awards and honors 
 Ogden is a member of two Inns of Court;
 Active member of both the American Bar Association (ABA) and OBA;

Notes

References 

Living people
Oklahoma State University alumni
People from Guymon, Oklahoma
People from Oklahoma County, Oklahoma
Year of birth missing (living people)